The 2005 Washington Huskies football team represented the University of Washington in the 2005 NCAA Division I FBS football season. Led by first-year head coach Tyrone Willingham, the team compiled a 2–9 record and tied for last in the Pacific-10 Conference. Home games were played on campus at Husky Stadium in Seattle.

Willingham was previously the head coach for three seasons at Notre Dame, preceded by seven years at Stanford.

Schedule

Roster

NFL Draft
One Husky was selected in the 2006 NFL Draft, which lasted seven rounds (255 selections).

References

Washington
Washington Huskies football seasons
Washington Huskies football